Raster may refer to:

 Raster graphics, graphical techniques using arrays of pixel values
 Raster graphics editor, a computer program
 Raster scan, the pattern of image readout, transmission, storage, and reconstruction in television and computer images
 Rasterisation, or rasterization, conversion of a vector image to a raster image
 Raster image processor, or RIP, a component of a printing system that performs rasterisation
 Raster interrupt, a computer interrupt signal
 Raster to vector, an image conversion process
 Raster bar, an effect used in computer demos
 Raster-Noton, a record label
 Rastrum, a device used in medieval music manuscripts to draw staff lines
 Raster Document Object, a file format

People 
 Christian Raster, statesman in Anhalt-Dessau
 Hermann Raster (1827–1891), German Forty-Eighter